This is the discography for German heavy metal band Avantasia.

Albums

Studio albums

Live albums

Video albums

EPs

Singles

Compilation albums

References 

Discographies of German artists
Heavy metal group discographies